Peter W. Culicover is Professor of Linguistics at Ohio State University. He works in the areas of syntactic theory (particularly on the syntax of English), language learnability and computational modelling of language acquisition and language change.

Education 
Culicover attended the City College of New York and graduated with a BA in mathematics in 1966. He earned his PhD from Massachusetts Institute of Technology, where he studied under Noam Chomsky.

Career 
He worked at Ohio State for the duration of his career, serving as the Chair of the Department of Linguistics, Director of the Center for Cognitive Science, and Associate Provost. He is now the Distinguished University Professor Emeritus of Linguistics.

Awards 
Culicover is a winner of Humboldt Prize and the Distinguished Scholar Award of Ohio State University.

Selected works
English Focus Constructions and the Theory of Grammar (with Michael S. Rochemont; Cambridge  University Press, 1990)
Principles and Parameters: An Introduction to Syntactic Theory (Oxford University Press, 1997)
Syntactic Nuts: Hard Cases in Syntax (Oxford University Press, 1999)
Dynamical Grammar (Oxford University Press, 2003)
(with Ray Jackendoff) Simpler Syntax (Oxford University Press, 2005)

References

Linguists from the United States
Living people
Ohio State University faculty
Syntacticians
Fellows of the American Academy of Arts and Sciences
Year of birth missing (living people)
Fellows of the Linguistic Society of America